The S.S. Lazio fans are supporters of Italian football club Lazio.

History

The beginning
The history of organized fan groups of S.S. Lazio, known in Italian as the Tifoseria Laziale, began in the late 1960s when small groups of supporters filled the steps of Stadio Olimpico in Rome. They belonged to different groups which were Tuparamos, Eagles, Ultras, Vigilantes, NAB, CAST and Marines, the latter consisting mostly of younger fans.

The foundation of Eagles Supporters
The early groups were not united and so in 1971, the first major ultras group was formed: Commandos Monteverde Lazio, also known as C.M.L. '74. In October 1976, a new club was formed in order to unify the supporters from the north to south stands under the temporary name G.A.B.A. (Gruppi Associati Bianco Azzurri). They decide to rename the group in Eagles' Supporters: the inspiration came from a member of the Brigate Gialloblù, the main Hellas Verona F.C. ultras group, who usually write "Hellas Supporters" on his letters. The 1st October 1978 during Lazio vs Juventus, in the first round of the 1978-79 Serie A, the Eagles' Supporters exposed their 56 meters banner in Curva Nord for the first time.

From 1978 to 1987
In 1978, a group called VIKING Lazio was formed, and took their place in the Curva Sud. In this same year, the Eagles Supporters, who originally began in the south stands, made their way to Curva Nord, which became the main Lazio terrace. Other small groups followed the Eagles besides Viking.

In 1979, a flare fired by a Roma fan from the opposite end of the stadium hit Lazio fan Vincenzo Paparelli in the eye and killed him. It was the first fatality in Italian football due to violence.

During the 1980s, the Curva Nord was admired and imitated by the rest of Italy because of their passion and originality which set them apart from the rest. During this time, Lazio's fans created what is known in Italy as a gemellaggio, or twinning, with fans of Bari, Torino and especially Triestina.

Despite this decade being one of Lazio's worst in history, avoiding a Third division relegation on a play-out match, the Curva became a major expression of passion, with several travelling groups filling opposition grounds around the country. The club maintained a significant number of supporters despite the fact that Lazio was playing in Serie B at the time. Approximately 20,000 fans followed the team to Pisa and Arezzo, 4,000 travelled to Udine, 80,000 attended a home match against Catania. Up to 35,000 travelled south to Napoli for Lazio's clashes with Campobasso and Taranto, two matches which became etched in the club's history and meant that the club avoided relegation to Serie C.

The arrival of the Irriducibili
During a Lazio-Padova match in 1987, a 10 meter long banner announced the arrival of a new Ultra group on the scene, Irriducibili Lazio formed by Antonio Grinta. Irriducibili rose to power in the Curva Nord and revolutionized the way Lazio fans supported their side. No more drums were used but English chanting styles were adopted. This contrasted boldly with the Italian style of the Eagles Supporters, and by 1992, Irriducibili were by far Lazio's most powerful group as the Eagles Supporters disbanded.

With the arrival of the new club president, Sergio Cragnotti, Lazio qualified for European competition becoming one of the world's strongest teams. During this period, Lazio ultras formed close ties with both Interisti and Veronesi. In addition to these, relationships with supporters of Real Madrid, Chelsea and Paris Saint Germain developed.

The number of traveling Lazio fans did not drop from the "old days" though, as approximately 4,000 travelled to Dortmund and Vienna, 20,000 to Paris, 15,000 to Birmingham for the 1999 UEFA Cup Winners' Cup Final and 10,000 to Monaco for the UEFA Supercup despite being allocated only 3,500 tickets.

The new millennium

The 2002–03 Serie A season was an important year for the Irriducibili as they achieved their fifteenth anniversary and in that same year, Lazio opted to retire the jersey number 12, permanently dedicated to Curva Nord.

The Curva Nord was led by the Banda Noantri; a group which existed from 2000 until 2005 but then disappeared due to some of the members getting banned from the stadium or sentenced to prison. They took over the Curva Nord from the Irriducibili during the season 2009/10, when the leaders of Irriducibili decided to invite politician Polverini on to the Curva Nord, which was not accepted by the vast majority of the ultras on the Curva Nord and on Tribuna Tevere. The leaders are members from the group Banda Noantri and from In Basso a Destra. Apart from those there are the CML '74. Groups such as Viking and Veterani disappeared many years ago. The Legione Mr. Enrich are based in the old Curva Sud-Maestrelli together with Ardite Schiere. In 2006, Sodalizio was born, allowing fans all over Italy to follow Lazio more actively, in both home and away matches. On 7 August 2019, Fabrizio "Diabolik" Piscitelli the leader of the Irriducibili, who was also involved in crime, was murdered. After 33 years, the Irriducibili disbanded on 27 February 2020, citing "too much blood, too many banning orders, too many arrests."

Gabriele Sandri case

On the morning of 11 November 2007 26-year-old Lazio fan Gabriele Sandri, a DJ from Rome, was killed by a shot in his neck while sitting inside a car, by a policeman, after some other fans of Lazio violently assaulted a group of Juventus ultras with stones on the A1 Motorway service station of Badia al Pino in Arezzo. Early reports suggested that a stray bullet from a gun, set to distract the group of ultras, hit the Lazio fan in the neck as he sat in a car and killed him. An emergency meeting set up between Lega Calcio president Antonio Matarrese and police chief Antonio Manganelli decided that the game between Inter and Lazio would be called off, but the rest of the fixtures would go ahead that day, starting at a slightly later time (about 10 minutes later). The Atalanta–Milan game was eventually suspended following unrest caused by local ultras attempting to break off the protection glass in order to invade the pitch and stop the match. Later in the afternoon, the Italian Football Federation chose to postpone also the game between Roma and Cagliari, whose kick off was scheduled for 8:30 pm at Stadio Olimpico, Rome. However, this did not prevent violent riots, as hundreds of armed hooligans attacked a police barracks and the CONI (Italian Olympic National Committee) headquarters in Rome.

Though Sandri's death was later held by some to have been caused by a tragic error by a policeman who claimed his gun went off as he was running. Prosecutors then opted initially to open an inquiry into manslaughter against the policeman; nevertheless, the initial hearing held that Sandri's death was culpable homicide, and the policeman involved (Luigi Spaccarotella) was condemned to 6 years imprisonment. On appeal, the higher court not only confirmed this judgment, but increased the punishment to 9 years and 4 months as an element of intentionality was found.

Gemellaggi
Lazio ultras' strongest friendship is with the ultras of Inter. This friendship was born around the mid-1980s and has grown stronger in recent years with the 1997–98 UEFA Cup final in Paris and the infamous 2001–02 Serie A season decider on 5 May 2002 at the Stadio Olimpico, when many fans of Lazio supported Inter, their opposition, hoping they would claim the Scudetto instead of hated rival Juventus. The match ended 4–2 to Lazio, a result which saw Inter lose their title on the last day.

Another twinning of Lazio was born during the 80s, with Triestina. It was formed when the two sides were both playing in Serie B. During a match against Lazio, the Triestina ultras unfurled a banner, stating in Italian: Welcome Eagles, together we return. The twinning got stronger when, during a Coppa Italia match at the Stadio Olimpico, between Triestina and Lazio's hated rivals Roma, the Triestina fans displayed Lazio banners in their terrace.

A friendship is held between the Lazio ultras and those of Hellas Verona. This is based on the two groups both being on the right-wing politically, and sharing the same ultras principles. However, Verona fans are twinned with those of Fiorentina, historically a rival of Lazio, which means there is only an amicizia, or friendship, instead of a true twinning. Another similar friendship is shared with the ultras of Chieti.

Since they first played in Europe, Lazio began to develop friendships at an international level. The most important are those with the Real Madrid ultras known as Ultras Sur, Espanyol Brigadas, Levski Sofia, West Ham and Wisla Krakow
The first, with Real Madrid, was born in 2001 during a UEFA Champions League match between the two teams, while that with West Ham grew from the two teams mutual love for Paolo Di Canio, who started his career at Lazio before moving to West Ham in the late 1990s and has since seen fans of both West Ham and Lazio attending each other's matches on a regular basis.

Rivalries
Lazio's most notable rivalry is with Lazio neighbours AS Roma, with matches between the two teams referred to as Derby della Capitale. The Rome derby has been the scene of several actions related to the political views of the fan bases. Some of Lazio's ultras used to use swastikas and fascist symbols on their banners, and they have displayed racist behaviour in several occasions during the derbies. Most notably, at a derby of the season 1998–99, laziali unfurled a 50-metre banner around the Curva Nord that read, "Auschwitz is your town, the ovens are your houses". Furthermore, laziali have often been recorded doing the infamous Roman Salute. Black players of Roma have often been receivers of racist and offensive behaviour. During the late 1970s, Lazio developed a strong hate for Pescara Calcio, who in return consider Lazio a rival. The ultras consider both Livorno and Atalanta to be among their greatest enemies. Both of these rivalries were born due to political ideologies, with both Livorno and Atalanta having predominately left-wing fans, while Lazio's hardcore is far-right. Lazio icon Paolo Di Canio and Livorno icon Cristiano Lucarelli have both performed controversial ideological salutes to fans during some of their matches. Other rivals in Italy include Fiorentina, Juventus, Napoli and Milan.

Racist and anti-Semitic incidents
In 1998, a group of Lazio fans unfurled an anti-Semitic banner which read: "Auschwitz Is Your Country; the Ovens Are Your Homes". Afterward, the Italian Football Federation had ordered a passage from "The Diary of Anne Frank" to be read out loud before all games the following weeks. In 2000, some Lazio fans had showed another banner in a match against Roma, which read: "Squad of blacks, terrace of Jews". In 2017, Lazio president Claudio Lotito visited a synagogue in Rome and brought a floral wreath in remembrance of Holocaust victims, as some Lazio fans had posted stickers of Anne Frank wearing a jersey of rivals Roma.

On 4 January 2023, during a Serie A match between Lecce and Lazio, Lecce players Samuel Umtiti and Lameck Banda were the subject of racist chants by the visitor section of Lazio supporters.

See also
Avanti ragazzi di Buda, a popular song among S.S. Lazio supporters

References

Further reading
 Testa, A. and Armstrong, G. (2008). "Words and actions: Italian ultras and neo-fascism" Social Identities, vol. 14 (4), pp. 473 – 490
 Testa, A. (2009) "UltraS: an Emerging Social Movement", Review of European Studies, vol. 1 (2), 54–63
 Testa, A. (2010). Contested Meanings: the Italian Media and the UltraS. Review of European Studies, vol 2(1), 15–24
 Testa, A. and Armstrong, G. (in press; November 2010). Football, Fascism and Fandom: The UltraS of Italian Football, A&C (Bloomsbury), London, Black Publishers.

External links
 Lazio fans sing West Ham anthem

S.S. Lazio
Italian football supporters' associations